Michelangelo Sosnowitz (born August 21, 1973) is an American music composer. His works include ballet, musical theater, electronic and popular music, as well as commercial, television and film. His feature film scores include A Novel Romance, winner Best Film at the NYC International Independent Film Festival, the Dan Fogler directorial debut Hysterical Psycho and the Deborah Kampmeier films Split and Tape (music by) and the Julia Verdin film Angie:Lost Girls. His original ballet 'Petrouchka' won Best Choreography at NYMF 2010. He wrote the opening theme music to The History Channel show Battles BC and original theme music for ENTV, Deadline Hollywood BlackTreeMedia and other PMC programming. He also wrote the score and theme music to the Colin Quinn Web series COP SHOW. Original Off-Broadway musicals include Crazy Head Space  and Love in the Middle Ages.

Career
Michelangelo began playing the piano at the age of five. His first published music happened in High School for a PBS Documentary called Oysters in the Long Island Sound in 1992. Also in 1992 Michelangelo won the Connecticut Songwriting Competition in its first year of inception. In 1993 and 1994 Michelangelo went to the Berkshire Theatre Festival and wrote songs and score for the Children's Theater. Michelangelo attended New York University studying at the Tisch School of the Arts and began composing music for student films, winning Best Score at the First Run Film Festival in 1996 for the film Soldier Boy and 1997 for the film Spirit. As a composer Michelangelo wrote music for pop/rock bands featured on Satellite radio and Internet radio as well as numerous television commercials ranging from Animal Planet, Acuvue, Mercedes Benz, Tervis Tumbler, Garnier Fructis and Street King (drink). Michelangelo also wrote extensive music for CONCACAF including their Champion's League theme and Gold Cup theme as well as stingers and promos.

Original Theater/Musicals
"Crazy Head Space" (created and co-composed by Elisabeth Davis, lyrics by Elisabeth Davis; directed by Errickson Wilcox and Gabriel Barre)
"Love in the Middle Ages" (book and lyrics by Eric Kornfeld; directed by Lisa Shriver)
"Peking Roulette" (written by Ben Thompson; winner- best score Midtown International Theater Festival )

Discography
Albums

Michelangelo
In The Beginning (self release, 1999)
Future Perfect (Two Shes Productions, 2004)
Rabbits Against Magic
Daylight (No Means Yes Productions, 2007)
Michelangelo Sosnowitz
Petrouchka (No Means Yes Productions, 2010)
Logan Tracey
For Sale (No Means Yes Productions, 2013)
Connor Reed
Looking For (Lemon Shark Productions, 2016)
Nat Lopez
Nat Lopez (Lemon Shark Productions, 2016)

Singles

The Glamazons 
Movie Star (Lemon Shark Productions, 2014)

Connor Reed
Looking For (Lemon Shark Productions, 2015)

Xan
Sorry For Myself (Lemon Shark Productions 2018)

Xan
Already Missing You (Lemon Shark Productions 2019)

Xan
Let You Love Me (Lemon Shark Productions 2021)

External links

 Official Website

References

1973 births
American male classical composers
American classical composers
American film score composers
American male film score composers
American television composers
Living people